Pachnistis nubivaga is a moth in the family Autostichidae. It was described by Edward Meyrick in 1921. It is found on Sulawesi in Indonesia.

The wingspan is about 14 mm. The forewings are fuscous, slightly violet tinged, obscurely speckled with grey whitish. The discal stigmata are cloudy, darker, the second rather large. The hindwings are light grey.

References

Moths described in 1921
Pachnistis
Taxa named by Edward Meyrick